Club Sport Colombia, is a Paraguayan football club based in the city of Fernando de la Mora. The club was founded November 1, 1924 and plays in the Paraguayan second division. Their home games are played at the Estadio Alfonso Colmán  which has a capacity of approximately 7,000 seats. The club is the former home of Jorge Daniel Florentín, Elio Mora, Ignacio Paniagua, Emilio Martinez, José Antonio Franco, Pedro Richard Irala, Carlos Antonio Mereles, Rodolfo Guillén, Marcelo Estigarribia and Victor Cristaldo.

Honours
Paraguayan Second Division: 6
1940, 1944, 1945, 1950, 1985, 1992

Paraguayan Third Division: 3
1944, 1969, 2007

Notable players
To appear in this section a player must have either:
 Played at least 125 games for the club.
 Set a club record or won an individual award while at the club.
 Been part of a national team at any time.
 Played in the first division of any other football association (outside of Paraguay).
 Played in a continental and/or intercontinental competition.

1990s
 Daniel Sanabria (1995–97)
 Nelson Cuevas (1997)
 Paulo da Silva (1997)
2000s
 Carlos Antonio Mereles (2002–04)
 Pedro Richard Irala (2003–04)
 Ignacio Paniagua (2004)
 Jorge Daniel Florentín (2004)
 Elias Rodriguez (2005)
 Marcelo Estigarribia (2005–06)
 Elio Mora (2009–10)
2010s
 Rodolfo Guillén (2010)
 Emilio Martínez (2011–)
 José Antonio Franco (2012–)
  Osvaldo Mendoza (2012)
Non-CONMEBOL players
 Victor Cristaldo (1996–1997)

References

External links
Sport Colombia Info

Sport Colombia
Association football clubs established in 1924
1924 establishments in Paraguay